Pedigree may refer to:

Breeding 
 Pedigree chart, a document to record ancestry, used by genealogists in study of human family lines, and in selective breeding of other animals
 Pedigree, a human genealogy (ancestry chart)
 Pedigree (animal), a pedigree chart pertaining to a purebred animal; may also refer to such a purebred animal itself, e.g. "a pedigree dog" or "a pedigreed dog". A collection or database of such pedigrees may be referred to as a breed registry, breed register, herdbook, or studbook. See in particular:
 Pedigree (dog), pertaining to a purebred domestic dog
 Pedigree (cat), pertaining to a purebred domestic cat

Brands and companies
 Pedigree Dolls & Toys, British toy company that produced Sindy dolls
 Pedigree Petfoods, a company that manufactures pet food
 Marston's Pedigree, an English ale

Other uses
Pedigree (novel), an autobiographical novel by Georges Simenon
 The Pedigree, a finishing maneuver in professional wrestling made famous by Triple H
Pedigree, a memoir by Patrick Modiano